Waqraqucha (Quechua waqra horn, qucha lake, lagoon, "horn lake", hispanicized names Huacracocha, Laguna Huacra) is a lake in Peru located in the Junín Region, Junín Province, Junín District. It belongs to the watershed of the Mantaro River. 

It is operated by Electroperu.

References 

Lakes of Peru
Lakes of Junín Region
Dams in Peru
Buildings and structures in Junín Region